Gamperaliya may refer to:

 Gamperaliya (novel), a novel by Martin Wickremasinghe
 Gamperaliya (film), a 1963 Sri Lankan drama film